Bellerose is a station along the Main Line and Hempstead Branch of the Long Island Rail Road (LIRR) which only serves trains along the Hempstead Branch.

History
Bellerose station was originally built in 1898 and rebuilt in the summer of 1909. It was out of service between December 12–15, 1960, and replaced with a third station between 1960 and 1961. Until 1960, the station had a platform on each side of the four-track Main Line, though almost all trains that stopped ran to and from Hempstead. As part of the grade crossing elimination the junction of Main Line and Hempstead Branch was moved west of Bellerose. The two lines remain closely parallel between Jamaica and Floral Park. The platform was placed between the two Hempstead Branch tracks.

Station layout
The station has one eight-car-long high-level island platform that serves the Hempstead Branch. Port Jefferson, Ronkonkoma, Oyster Bay, and Montauk Branch trains pass through the station without stopping, using the Main Line tracks that parallel the Hempstead Branch just to the north.

References

External links

QUEENS Interlocking (The LIRR Today)
Unofficial LIRR History Website
1959 Photo of 1909 Bellerose Station
Commonwealth Boulevard View
Atlantic Avenue View
Platform View towards New York City
 Atlantic Avenue entrance from Google Maps Street View (underpass)
Platform from Google Maps Street View
Waiting room from Google Maps Street View

Long Island Rail Road stations in Nassau County, New York
Railway stations in the United States opened in 1898